Epitolina larseni, the Larsen's epitolina, is a butterfly in the family Lycaenidae. It is found in eastern Nigeria, Cameroon, Gabon, the Republic of the Congo and the Central African Republic. Its habitat consists of forests.

References

Butterflies described in 2000
Poritiinae